Hikari Nadeshiko (ひかりなでしこ) is the second full-length album from Eiko Shimamiya. It includes the hit single Naraku no Hana (opening from the Higurashi no Naku Koro ni Kai). It was released on April 2, 2008. It reached the 27th place on the Oricon Weekly Albums Chart.

The catalog numbers for this album are: GNCV-1003 for the limited edition with a bonus DVD which will contain the PV for the album title Hikari Nadeshiko and GNCV-1004 for the regular edition (CD only).

Track listing

Charts and sales

References

2008 albums
Eiko Shimamiya albums